Scorpion is an American drama television series developed by Nick Santora for CBS. The series premiered on September 22, 2014, and is loosely based on the life of self-proclaimed genius and computer expert Walter O'Brien. The series follows Walter O'Brien and his team of genius outcasts as they are recruited by federal agent Cabe Gallo of the U.S. Department of Homeland Security to form Scorpion, said to be the last line of defense against complex, high-tech threats around the globe.

On May 12, 2018, CBS cancelled the series after four seasons.

Series overview

Episodes

Season 1 (2014–15)

Season 2 (2015–16)

Season 3 (2016–17)

Season 4 (2017–18)

Ratings

Season 1

Season 2

Season 3

Season 4

References

External links

Lists of American drama television series episodes